Yerupaja Chico is a mountain in Peru.

Yerupaja Chicho rises  and neighboring Yerupaja rises . The names' literal translations are yerupaja – smaller and yerupaja – larger. They are two peaks in the Peruvian Andes. They can be viewed from above Laguna Solteracocha on the way up to Punta Sambuya on trekking trails through the Huayhuash. Chico is claimed to be a technically more difficult project for mountain climbers, although it is approximately 600 metres lower.

References

External links

 Photo of the mountain

Six-thousanders of the Andes
Mountains of Peru
Lima Province
Mountains of Lima Region